A statue of John Sutter was installed in Sacramento, California, United States, created in 1987. The monument was removed in June 2020.

See also
 List of monuments and memorials removed during the George Floyd protests

References

Buildings and structures in Sacramento, California
John Sutter
Monuments and memorials in California
Monuments and memorials removed during the George Floyd protests
Outdoor sculptures in California
Sculptures of men in California
Statues in California
Statues removed in 2020